This is a list of long marriages. It includes marriages extending over at least 80 years.

Background
A study by Robert and Jeanette Lauer, reported in the Journal of Family Issues, conducted on 40 sets of spouses married for at least 50 years, concluded that the long-term married couples received high scores on the Lock-Wallace marital satisfaction test and were closely aligned on how their marriages were doing. In a 1979 study on about 55 couples in marriages with an average length of 55.5 years, couples said their marriages lasted so long because of mutual devotion and special regard for each other. Couples who have been married for a long time have a lower likelihood of divorcing because "common economic interests and friendship networks increase over time" and during stress can assist in sustaining the relationship.

Another study found that people in long marriages are wedded to the idea of "marital permanency" in which "They don't see divorce as an option". Sociologist Pepper Schwartz, the American Association of Retired Persons's relationships authority, said that it was helpful to have a spouse who is quick to recover when there are surprises in life.

A study of 1,152 couples who had been married for over 50 years found that they attributed their long marriages to faith in each other, love, ability to make concessions, admiration for each other, reliance on each other, children, and strong communication. Bowling Green State University (BGSU)'s National Center for Family and Marriage Research found that 7% of American marriages last at least 50 years.

Recording longest marriages

The longest marriage recorded (although not officially recognized) is a granite wedding anniversary (90 years) between Karam and Kartari Chand, who both lived in the United Kingdom, but were married in India. Karam and Kartari Chand married in 1925 and died in 2016 and 2019 respectively.

Guinness World Records published its first edition in 1955. In the 1984 to 1998 editions, the longest recorded marriages were between Dr. Sir Temulji Bhicaji Nariman and Lady Nariman, and Lazarus and Mary Molly Rowe according to the New England Historical and Genealogical Register, both of them stated as spanning 86 years. Guinness has since recognized couples with longer marriage spans, with the current world record holders being Herbert and Zelmyra Fisher. Guinness also keeps record of the oldest married couple by aggregate age.

Other organizations have created events where they honor couples with long marriages. In 2011, World Marriage Encounter (WME), an American organization that was responsible for making a World Marriage Day, created a Longest Married Couple Project (LMCP), where they pick a couple with a long marriage and honor them on Valentine's Day. They have since expanded the awards to representatives in each of the 50 states, although the candidates selected are not necessarily the ones with record-setting marriages. Starting in 2004, the Louisiana Family Forum (LFF) has honored its own annual list of long-time married couples in that particular state, beginning with George and Germaine Briant.

List of marriages reported to be more than 80 years

Notes

References

long marriages
Marriages
Lists of longest-duration things